Marcel Strauss (born 25 August 1976 in Feuerthalen) is a Swiss former professional road bicycle racer, last riding for UCI ProTeam Gerolsteiner. He retired in 2008, when that team folded.

Palmares 

 2nd, National Road Race Championship (2000–2006)
 3rd (2005)
 Ster Elektrotoer - 1 stage (2002)
 Giro della Svizzera Meridionale - Overall (2000)
 2nd, National U19 Road Race Championship (1993–1994)

References

External links 
Profile at Gerolsteiner official website

Swiss male cyclists
1976 births
Living people
People from Feuerthalen
Sportspeople from the canton of Zürich